Thomas William Andrews (T. Bill) (born 1958 Kansas) is an American abstract impressionist painter and author. He paints landscapes, florals and representational and architectural pieces in the style of impressionism, as well as figurative studies, but his primary emphasis is on extremely large-format action painting in a style reminiscent of Jackson Pollock and other painters in the New York School of painting known as abstract expressionism.

Life 
After serving in the U.S. Navy Nuclear Power Program, he enrolled as an undergraduate member of the University of Iowa Writers' Workshop in the mid-1980s.  It was while at the Writers' Workshop that he adopted his pen name "T. Bill" (sometimes "T-Bill".  He then received his doctorate from Yale University, writing a fictionalized memoir of his experiences at Yale entitled "Power Ties."

Long retired, his current painting studio fronts a large horse meadow.  His largest collection of work is at his flagship gallery in West Des Moines. Acquisitions at other galleries are handled by Mid-America Art Brokers of St. Louis.

Works
 Power Ties, Instantpublisher.com, 2004,

References

External links 
Understanding Abstract Art by Harley Hahn

See also
Abstract expressionism
Action painting

20th-century American male writers
21st-century American male writers
Living people
20th-century American painters
20th-century American male artists
American male painters
21st-century American painters
21st-century American male artists
Iowa Writers' Workshop alumni
Yale Law School alumni
1958 births